Nanzi may refer to:

Anansi, an Akan mythological spider, also spelled Nanzi
Nanzih District, Kaohsiung, Taiwan, also spelled Nanzi
Lady Nanzi (died 480 BC), consort of Duke Ling of Wey in ancient China